A Certificate of Advanced Study (CAS), also called an "Advanced Certificate" (AC), Certificate of Advanced Graduate Study (CAGS), or a Certificate of Advanced Professional Studies (CAPS), is a post-Master's academic certificate designed for professional and non traditional students, as well as practitioners who seek a continuing education program to enhance their professional development in areas such as liberal arts, education, library science, and Software Engineering. Some CAGS are connected to an existing doctoral program such as PhD in Organizational Leadership: for example, PhD students receive a CAGS in Leadership Studies after completing their 2 years of doctoral study at Eastern University.

Liberal Arts certificates of advanced graduate study are offered by some institutions that offer master's degrees in interdisciplinary liberal arts. These certificate programs are designed to hone critical thinking skills and personal knowledge of a chosen field, in addition to encouraging professional development.  They typically require 30 hours of graduate study beyond the master's degree.

For some disciplines, this certificate requires a three-year post-bachelor's program equivalent to a Specialist degree.
For example, School Psychologists must earn an MA/AC or CAS (Master's degree plus Advanced Certification) or Ed.S degree in order to practice in a school setting or be eligible for national certification. These are all Specialist-level degrees due to a required 1200-hour internship experience and 60+ hours of graduate study.

Library and information science CAS programs are intended to allow students to closely focus on a particular sub-area of library and information science after earning a master's degree in the discipline. Some students advance directly to the CAS after finishing their master's degree, others return for a CAS after working in the field. The certificate generally takes one to two years to complete, including a culminating cumulative exam or extensive project. Such programs are offered by many, but not all, of the U.S. institutions of higher education that issue American Library Association-accredited master's degrees.

See also 
 Graduate certificate

References

Academic degrees of the United States